Muong ethnic religion  is an ethnic religion, among the Muong, in Vietnam. It is polytheistic, sharing many supernatural beings with Vietnamese folk religion. This ethnic religion has the lunar new year as main religious festival, including 
ancestor veneration.

Every living person is thought to have many souls.
It sees the passage from life to death in stages.
It sees the soul as being divided in 90 parts.

See also
 Tai folk religion
 Mo (religion)
 Vietnamese folk religion
 Yao folk religion

References

Religion in Vietnam
Asian ethnic religion